Wigald Boning (born 20 January 1967) is a German comedian, television presenter, actor, and author.

Boning has appeared in different TV and film productions in Germany. He became famous as an actor in the television comedy programme RTL Samstag Nacht.  

Together with Olli Dittrich, Boning sang in the music group Die Doofen. He has also released several books.

Personal life
In 2017, Boning married German opera singer Teresa Tièschky.

Works

Film 
 1989: Hard Days, Hard Nights
 1990: Der geile Osten, eine Reise durch die letzten Tage der DDR
 1996: Babes' Petrol
 1998: (National Lampoon's) Men in White

TV 
 1991: Bonings Bonbons
 1992–1993: Extra 3
 1993: Canale Grande
 1993–1998: RTL Samstag Nacht
 1999: ProSieben MorningShow
 2001–2002: TV-Quartett
 2001–2004: WIB-Schaukel
 2004–2008: Clever! – Die Show, die Wissen schafft
 2006: Die ProSieben Märchenstunde: Rotkäppchen – Wege zum Glück
 2006–2007: Extreme Activity
 2007: FamilyShowdown
 2009: Clever! Spezial
 2012: XXS – Hilfe, wir werden geschrumpft!
 since 2017: Genial Daneben
 since 2018: Genial Daneben - Das Quiz

Books 
 1996: Fliegenklatschen in Aspik, 
 1998: Unser Land soll schöner werden. Das Programm für Deutschland, 
 2007: Bekenntnisse eines Nachtsportlers, 
 2010: In Rio steht ein Hofbräuhaus: Reisen auf fast allen Kontinenten,

Awards

For 'Die Doofen' 

 1995: Goldene Stimmgabel
 1995: Bambi Award
 1995: ECHO
 1995: Goldene Europa
 1995: Comet Award

Personal 
 2004: Adolf-Grimme-Preis for WIB-Schaukel: Wigald Boning trifft Jürgen Drews auf Mallorca
 2005: Deutscher Fernsehpreis for Clever!

References

External links 

 Personal website
 
 

1967 births
Living people
German male singers
German male television actors
German male film actors
German television presenters
German male comedians
People from Wildeshausen